Kirkandrews railway station was a railway station near Kirkandrews-on-Eden, Cumberland (now in Cumbria), England, on the Port Carlisle Railway branch and later the Silloth branch. The station served the village and the rural district. Kirkandrews closed on 7 September 1964; the station building survives as a private dwelling. The line to Silloth closed on 7 September 1964 as part of the Beeching cuts.

History 
In 1819 a port was constructed at Port Carlisle and in 1821, the Carlisle Navigation Canal. was built to take goods to Carlisle. The canal was closed in 1853 and much of it was infilled by the Port Carlisle Railway Company who constructed a railway that started passenger services in 1854, discontinuing them two years later when the Carlisle & Silloth Bay Railway & Dock Company's (C&SBRDC) new railway to Silloth opened, utilising the Port Carlisle Branch as far as Drumburgh.

The North British Railway leased the line from 1862, it was absorbed by them in 1880, and then taken over by the London and North Eastern Railway in 1923.

Infrastructure
The station sat close to the village in the cut of the old canal; it had a single platform, and a shelter. The branch ran close to the course of Hadrian's Wall. A substantial station building was present. A large seed warehouse was located at the station. In common with other stations on the line, it had its name picked out in sea shells on a raised area opposite the station building.

References 

Notes

Sources

External links
 Kirkandrews station Cumbria Gazetteer
 Kirkandrews station Deborah Irwin
 Kirkandrews station Cumbria Railways
 The station on an Edwardian 6" OS map National Library of Scotland
 The station and line Rail Maps Online
 The station and line, with mileages Railway Codes
 Cumbria Gazetteer

Disused railway stations in Cumbria
Former North British Railway stations
Railway stations in Great Britain opened in 1854
Railway stations in Great Britain closed in 1964
Beeching closures in England
Beaumont, Cumbria